In enzymology, a benzaldehyde dehydrogenase (NADP+) is an enzyme that catalyzes the chemical reaction

benzaldehyde + NADP+ + H2O  benzoate + NADPH + 2 H+

The 3 substrates of this enzyme are benzaldehyde, NADP+, and H2O, whereas its 3 products are benzoate, NADPH, and H+.

This enzyme belongs to the family of oxidoreductases, specifically those acting on the aldehyde or oxo group of donor with NAD+ or NADP+ as acceptor.  The systematic name of this enzyme class is benzaldehyde:NADP+ oxidoreductase. Other names in common use include NADP+-linked benzaldehyde dehydrogenase, and benzaldehyde dehydrogenase (NADP+).  This enzyme participates in benzoate degradation via hydroxylation and toluene and xylene degradation.

References

 
 

EC 1.2.1
NADPH-dependent enzymes
Enzymes of unknown structure